A shamrock is a three leaf clover (or sometimes other plants with similar leaves) that is a symbol of Ireland.

Shamrock, Sham Rock or Shamrocks may also refer to:

Music
 Sham Rock, an Irish novelty folk band
 Shamrock (Filipino band), an alternative band from the Philippines
 Sham Rock, an album by Beatnik Turtle
 "Shamrock" (song), a 2006 UVERworld single
 "Shamrock", a 1962 song by Calvin Boze
 "Shamrock", a 1968 song by Nathan Abshire

Places

United States
 Shamrock, Imperial County, California
 Shamrock, Kern County, California
 Shamrock, Florida, an unincorporated community
 Shamrock Township, Aitkin County, Minnesota
 Shamrock, Missouri, an unincorporated community
 Shamrock Township, Callaway County, Missouri
 Shamrock Township, Holt County, Nebraska
 Shamrock, Oklahoma, an unincorporated community
 Shamrock, Texas, a city
 Shamrock, Wisconsin, an unincorporated community

Canada
 Rural Municipality of Shamrock No. 134, Saskatchewan
 Shamrock, Saskatchewan, a village

Sports

Australia
 Dundas Shamrocks Junior Rugby League Football Club, Balmain, Australia

Canada
 Erin Shamrocks, a junior ice hockey team in Ontario
 Victoria Shamrocks, a box lacrosse team in British Columbia
 Montreal Shamrocks GAA
 Parry Sound Shamrocks, a former junior ice hockey team in Ontario
 Montreal Shamrocks, a former ice hockey team
 Hespeler Shamrocks (2018–), junior ice hockey team in Simcoe, Ontario

Ireland
 Shamrock Rovers F.C., Tallaght, South Dublin
 Cortoon Shamrocks, GAA
 Raheny Shamrock Athletic Club, Dublin
 Shamrocks GAA (County Cork)

Northern Ireland
 Ballinderry Shamrocks GAC, County Londonderry

United States
 Boston Jr. Shamrocks, a junior ice hockey team
 South Carolina Shamrocks, a former soccer team
 Boston Shamrocks (1971–72), alias of the Washington Generals
 St. Louis Shamrocks, a former soccer team
 St. Louis Shamrocks (1935-1938), a former soccer team
 Boston Shamrocks (AFL), a former American Football League 
 Pittsburgh Shamrocks, a former ice hockey team
 Chicago Shamrocks, a former ice hockey team

Naval vessels 
 HMS Shamrock, a number of British ships
 , a Union Navy gunboat during the American Civil War

Transport

Land 
 Shamrock Buses, a bus company based in Poole, Dorset, UK
 Shamrock (car), a car produced in Ireland during the 1950s
 1893 Shamrock, an early Canadian car

Sea 
 Shamrock (yacht), an unsuccessful challenger for the 1899 America's Cup 
 Shamrock II, an unsuccessful challenger for the 1901 America's Cup
 , an unsuccessful challenger for the 1903 America's Cup 
 , an unsuccessful challenger in the 1920 America's Cup
 , an unsuccessful challenger in the 1929 America's Cup
 The Shamrock, an Alaskan gold mining dredge featured on Bering Sea Gold: Under The Ice reality Television show
 Shamrock, a Tamar barge sailing vessel for carrying cargo

People
 Billey Shamrock (born 1964), Swedish entertainer
 Ken Shamrock (born 1964), former wrestler / mixed martial artist
 Frank Shamrock (born 1972), former mixed martial artist
 "Ryan Shamrock", Alicia Webb's wrestling name from 1998 to 1989

Fictional characters
 Shamrock (comics), a minor Marvel Comics superhero
 Sean "Shamrock" McGinty, a member of the Barksdale Organization on the television series The Wire
 Marcus Lampert "Shamrock", a character on Ace Combat 6: Fires of Liberation

Businesses
 Shamrock Farms, a dairy farm in Arizona
 Shamrock Foods, an Irish food brand
 Shamrock Holdings, a company that manages Roy Edward Disney's personal holdings
 Shamrock Hotel or Shamrock Hilton, an hotel in Houston, Texas
 Shamrock Oil Company
 Shamrock, the callsign of airline Aer Lingus

Other uses
 Shamrocks, a solitaire card game
 Shamrock Club of Wisconsin
 Shamrock School, Winnipeg, Manitoba
 Shamrock Organization, an organizational structure
 Operation Shamrock, a plan to bring orphaned German children to Ireland from post-World War II Germany
 Project SHAMROCK, a Cold-War-era US espionage exercise
 The Shamrock, a 1777 Irish play or pasticcio opera by John O'Keeffe

See also
 
 Oxalis regnellii, sometimes called "false shamrock"
 Trigonella suavissima, sometimes called "Australian shamrock"